The Forfeitures Act 1360 (34 Ed.3 c.12) was an Act of the Parliament of England. It prohibited "forfeiture for treason of [by] dead persons not attainted or judged in their lives." Prior to the Act being passed, land and goods had been confiscated from the surviving relatives of dead people as a penalty for treason committed by the deceased even though they had not been convicted during their lifetime. The Act prevented the posthumous seizure of property for treason except where the prior owner had been convicted while they were alive.

References
Statutes at Large, vol. II, Danby Pickering, Cambridge University Press (1762), pp. 141–142.

See also
High treason in the United Kingdom
Treason Act

Treason in England
Acts of the Parliament of England
1360s in law
1360 in England